Countess of Huntingdon may refer to:

Maud, Countess of Huntingdon
Matilda of Chester, Countess of Huntingdon
Mary Woodville (c. 1456–1481)
Anne Hastings, Countess of Huntingdon (c. 1483–1544)
Katherine Hastings, Countess of Huntingdon (1540s–1620)
Elizabeth Hastings, Countess of Huntingdon (1588–1633)
Lucy Hastings, Countess of Huntingdon (1613–1679)
Selina Hastings, Countess of Huntingdon (1707–1791)

See also
Earl of Huntingdon